Đuro Deželić (Ivanić-Grad, 25 March 1838 – Zagreb, 28 October 1907) was a Croatian writer. 

After finishing law school at the University of Zagreb, he soon became involved with the city's municipal government. From 1871 until his death he served as a member of the Zagreb city council and deputy mayor of Zagreb. In 1868 he established the Croatian firefighting service. Politically, he considered himself a Unionist until 1873, but in later years he shifted closer to the Party of Rights. 

He was also editor of Narodne novine (1862-1864) and Danica (1863-1864) newspapers, and was the first editor of magazines Domobran (1864) and Vienac (1869). He also wrote historical and philosophical essays, political articles, poetry, short stories, novels, travel literature and biographies of notable Croats. His contemporaries were especially fond of his popular history articles dealing with Croatian history.

Sources
Umro Gjuro Deželić 

1838 births
1907 deaths
People from Ivanić-Grad
Croatian writers
Party of Rights politicians
Burials at Mirogoj Cemetery